Micronaut is a software framework for the Java virtual machine platform.

It is designed to avoid reflection, thus reducing memory consumption and improving start times. Features which would typically be implemented at run-time are instead pre-computed at compile time.

It was created by Graeme Rocher, who also created the Grails framework.

References

External links

Software frameworks